Dobri Marinov Ivanov (born 22 November 1965) is a Bulgarian wrestler. He competed in the men's Greco-Roman 74 kg at the 1992 Summer Olympics.

References

External links
 

1965 births
Living people
Bulgarian male sport wrestlers
Olympic wrestlers of Bulgaria
Wrestlers at the 1992 Summer Olympics
Place of birth missing (living people)